Alex Strangelove is a 2018 American romantic comedy film, written and directed by Craig Johnson and starring Daniel Doheny, Antonio Marziale and Madeline Weinstein.

The film had its world premiere at the San Francisco International Film Festival on April 14, 2018. It was released on June 8, 2018, on Netflix.

Plot
High school student Alex Truelove has long been best friends with Claire. After discovering her mother is being tested for cancer, she and Alex share a moment where Alex comforts her. They kiss and then begin dating. After Alex is embarrassed in front of his friends about still being a virgin, he and Claire make a plan to book a hotel room and have sex for the first time. 

At a party, Alex meets Elliot, an openly gay teenager. Alex's continued interactions with Elliot, who has an obvious crush on Alex, lead him to question his sexuality. Alex confesses to his friend Dell that he believes he might be bisexual, but Dell says that he is just nervous about losing his virginity to Claire and his anxiety has led him to a false conclusion. One day while hanging out in Elliot's bedroom, Alex kisses him, but immediately regrets it and storms out.

During the evening of their first time having sex, Alex blurts out to Claire that he has feelings for someone else and she throws him out. Later, still avoiding Elliot, Alex goes to a party where he drunkenly sleeps with a girl he only just met. Claire catches them, and Alex chases her into the night. He falls into a swimming pool where traumatic memories from his childhood come back to him. Claire finds him by the pool, where he confesses to her that he is gay. They decide to go to prom together anyway.

At prom, Claire reveals she has invited Elliot to be Alex's actual date, knowing that neither of them would actually make the move without her "passing the baton". While Alex is initially concerned about everyone watching him, he decides that his affection for Elliot is stronger and kisses him.

The story ends with Alex creating a video with Claire detailing his coming out.

Cast
 Daniel Doheny as Alex Truelove
 Antonio Marziale as Elliot
 Madeline Weinstein as Claire
 Daniel Zolghadri as Dell
 Nik Dodani as Blake
 Fred Hechinger as Josh
 Annie Q. as Sophie Hicks
 Ayden Mayeri as Hilary
 Kathryn Erbe as Helen
 Joanna P. Adler as Holly Truelove
 William Ragsdale as Ron Truelove
 Isabella Amara as Gretchen
 Sophie Faulkenberry as Sierra
 Dante Costabile as Dakota
 Isley Reust as Isley
 Jesse James Keitel as Sidney

Production
In May 2016, it was announced Craig Johnson would write and direct the film, with Jared Goldman, Ben Stiller and Nicholas Weinstock producing the film, under their Red Hour Films banner. STX Entertainment would distribute the film. In April 2017, Netflix acquired the film, with STX Entertainment still producing the film. That same month, Daniel Doheny joined the cast of the film. In June 2017, Nik Dodani and Antonio Marziale joined the cast of the film.

Filming
Principal photography began in May 2017.

Release
The film had its world premiere at the San Francisco International Film Festival on April 14, 2018. It was released on June 8, 2018, on Netflix.

Reception

The website's critical consensus reads, "Alex Strangelove offers a refreshingly insightful – and fittingly adult – take on teen sexuality enlivened by smart humor and a fearlessly progressive approach." On Metacritic, the film has a weighted average score of 62 out of 100, based on 10 critics, indicating "generally favorable reviews".

References

External links
 

2018 films
2018 romantic comedy films
2010s coming-of-age films
2018 LGBT-related films
American romantic comedy films
American coming-of-age films
American high school films
American LGBT-related films
Films shot in New York City
Films produced by Ben Stiller
Gay-related films
English-language Netflix original films
Red Hour Productions films
STX Entertainment films
LGBT-related coming-of-age films
2010s English-language films
Films directed by Craig Johnson
2010s American films